The Bird Hills are a mountain range in Lassen County, California.

References 

Mountain ranges of Lassen County, California
Mountain ranges of Northern California